Hypolimnas is a genus of tropical brush-footed butterflies commonly known as eggflies or diadems. The genus contains approximately 23 species, most of which are found in Africa, Asia, and Oceania. One species, the Danaid eggfly (H. misippus), is noted for its exceptionally wide distribution across five continents; it is the only Hypolimnas species found in the Americas.

Eggflies are known for their marked sexual dimorphism and Batesian mimicry of poisonous milkweed butterflies (Danainae). For example, the Danaid eggfly mimics Danaus chrysippus while the great eggfly (H. bolina) mimics the Australian crow (Euploea core). In each case, the eggfly mimics the danainid's markings, thus adopting the latter's distasteful reputation to predators without being poisonous itself.

Species
Listed alphabetically:
Hypolimnas alimena (Linnaeus, 1758) – blue-banded eggfly
Hypolimnas anomala (Wallace, 1869) – Malayan eggfly
Hypolimnas antevorta (Distant, 1880)
Hypolimnas anthedon (Doubleday, 1845) – variable eggfly or variable diadem
Hypolimnas antilope (Cramer, [1777]) – spotted crow eggfly
Hypolimnas aubergeri Hecq, 1987 – Côte d'Ivoire eggfly
Hypolimnas aurifascia Mengel, 1903
Hypolimnas bartelotti Grose-Smith, 1890
Hypolimnas bolina (Linnaeus, 1758) – common eggfly or great eggfly
Hypolimnas chapmani (Hewitson, 1873) – Chapman's eggfly
Hypolimnas deceptor (Trimen, 1873) – deceptive eggfly
Hypolimnas deois Hewitson, 1858
Hypolimnas dexithea (Hewitson, 1863) – Madagascar diadem
Hypolimnas dinarcha (Hewitson, 1865) – large variable diadem or large variable eggfly
Hypolimnas diomea Hewitson, 1861
Hypolimnas dimona Fruhstorfer, 1912
Hypolimnas euploeoides Rothschild, 1915
Hypolimnas fraterna Wallace, 1869
Hypolimnas inopinata Waterhouse, 1920
Hypolimnas macarthuri Neidhoefer, 1972
Hypolimnas mechowi (Dewitz, 1884)
Hypolimnas misippus (Linnaeus, 1764) – mimic, Danaid eggfly, or diadem
Hypolimnas monteironis (Druce, 1874) – black-tipped diadem or scarce blue diadem
Hypolimnas octocula Butler, 1869 – eight-spot diadem
Hypolimnas pandarus (Linnaeus, 1758)
Hypolimnas pithoeca Kirsch, 1877
Hypolimnas salmacis (Druce, 1773) – blue diadem
Hypolimnas saundersii (Hewitson, 1869)
Hypolimnas usambara (Ward, 1872) – red spot diadem or Usambara diadem

References 

Lewis, H. L. (1974). Butterflies of the World. 
Miller, L. D., and Miller, J. Y. (2004). The Butterfly Handbook, pp. 134–135. Barron's Educational Series, Inc.; Hauppauge, New York. 
Wynter-Blyth, M. A. (1957). Butterflies of the Indian Region. (1982 Reprint)
Seitz, A. Die Gross-Schmetterlinge der Erde 13: Die Afrikanischen Tagfalter. Plate XIII 42 et seq.

External links

Images representing Hypolimnas at Consortium for the Barcode of Life

 
Kallimini
Taxa named by Jacob Hübner
Butterfly genera